Al-Hoda was a daily Arabic-language newspaper in New York City. It was founded in Philadelphia as a bi-weekly by Naoum Anthony Mokarzel, a young Maronite Lebanese man with an interest in journalism. Its first issue came out on February 22, 1898. The paper's offices moved to New York City in 1902, where it became a daily, beginning on August 25. 

This was one of the first Arabic language newspapers in the United States. It was the first Arabic language newspaper to use Arabic character linotype rather than hand-setting. Mokarzel remained the paper's owner and chief editor until his death in 1932.  The editorship was then assumed by Naoum's brother Salloum, who held it until 1952. Salloum Mokarzel also founded The Syrian World—a journal that published articles on the history and culture of Syria.

The newspaper closed in September 1972.

See also
Afifa Karam, Al-Hoda journalist

References

Famous First Facts: A Record of First Happenings, Discoveries and Inventions in American History, by Joseph Nathan Kane.
Al-Hoda, 1898-1968: The Story of Lebanon and Its Emigrants as Taken from the Newspaper Al-Hoda (Al-Hoda Press, 1968).

Arab-American culture in New York City
Lebanese-American culture in New York (state)
Daily newspapers published in New York City
Publications established in 1898
Arabic-language newspapers published in the United States
1898 establishments in Pennsylvania
Non-English-language newspapers published in New York (state)
Publications disestablished in 1972
1972 disestablishments in New York (state)